Svinninge is a railroad town in Holbæk Municipality, Region Zealand in Denmark with a population of 2,862 (1 January 2022).

The town is located at Odsherredsbanen, the railroad between Holbæk and Nykøbing Sjælland operated by Lokaltog A/S.

Until 1 January 2007, Svinninge was the municipal seat of the former Svinninge Municipality.

Landmarks
SEAS-NVE is headquartered in Svinninge.

Notable people 
 Anna Thea Madsen (born 1994), Danish badminton player; lives in Svinninge

References 

Cities and towns in Region Zealand
Holbæk Municipality